The Inheritance is a 1976 Italian drama film directed by Mauro Bolognini. It was entered into the 1976 Cannes Film Festival, where Dominique Sanda won the award for Best Actress.

Plot
Rome, 1880. Gregorio Ferramonti (Anthony Quinn) has decided to close the family bakery. Then he tells his sons Pippo (Gigi Proietti) and Mario (Fabio Testi), and daughter Teta (Adriana Asti) that they will have to fend for themselves. But Irene (Dominique Sanda), Pippo's beautiful, calculating new wife, is determined to inherit the family fortune, and uses the guise of reconciling old family feuds to do so.

Cast
 Anthony Quinn - Gregorio Ferramonti
 Fabio Testi - Mario Ferramonti
 Dominique Sanda - Irene Carelli Ferramonti
 Gigi Proietti - Pippo Ferramonti (as Luigi Proietti)
 Adriana Asti - Teta Ferramonti Furlin
 Paolo Bonacelli - Paolo Furlin
 Rossella Rusconi - Flaviana Barbati
 Harold Bradley - Andrea Barbati (as Harald Bromley)
 Carlo Palmucci
 Silvia Cerio - Signora Minnelli
 Maria Russo - Rosa Carelli
 Simone Santo - Armando Carelli
 Rossana Di Lorenzo - Matilde

See also    
 List of Italian films of 1976

References

External links

1976 films
Italian drama films
1970s Italian-language films
1976 drama films
Films directed by Mauro Bolognini
Films set in Rome
Films scored by Ennio Morricone
1970s Italian films